Committed is an American television sitcom that aired on NBC as a midseason replacement from January 4 to March 15, 2005. Although originally broadcast twice a week (on Tuesdays and Thursdays) the series eventually settled in a regular timeslot on Tuesdays at 9:30 p.m. EST after Scrubs. The show starred Josh Cooke and Jennifer Finnigan and costarred Darius McCrary, Tammy Lynn Michaels, and Tom Poston. Cooke and Finnigan played two single and extremely eccentric New Yorkers who are subject to constant interference when they begin dating from their equally eccentric friends and Finnigan's roommate, known only as "Dying Clown" or "Clown" who was actually a clown, played by Tom Poston.

The show ran for 13 episodes.  Clips and fan-generated montages can still be found online, but no official DVDs have been produced.

Cast

Main
 Josh Cooke as Nate Solomon
 Jennifer Finnigan as Marni Fliss
 Darius McCrary as Bowie James
 Tammy Lynn Michaels as Tess
 Tom Poston as Clown

Recurring
 RonReaco Lee as Todd

Episodes

Broadcasters
 NBC (United States)
 Global (Canada)
 VT4 (Belgium)
 Channel Seven (Australia)
 TV 2 (New Zealand)
 Paramount Comedy (UK and Ireland) where it previously went under its working title Crazy for You
 Five (UK)
 Fox (Latin America)
 ComedyMax (Turkey)

References

External links
 

2000s American sitcoms
2005 American television series debuts
2005 American television series endings
NBC original programming
Television series by Universal Television
English-language television shows
Television shows set in New York City
Television shows about clowns